Domingo Gabriel Martínez Saucedo (born 4 August 1982 in Caraguatay, Paraguay) is a Paraguayan footballer currently playing for Macará of the Serie A in Ecuador.

Teams
  Nacional Asunción 2004
  Cobreloa 2005
  Deportes Puerto Montt 2005–2006
  Nacional Asunción 2006–2008
  2 de Mayo 2009
  Independiente José Terán 2010–2011
  Macará 2011–present

External links
 Profile at BDFA
 

1982 births
Living people
People from Caraguatay, Paraguay
Paraguayan footballers
Paraguayan expatriate footballers
C.S.D. Independiente del Valle footballers
C.S.D. Macará footballers
Club Nacional footballers
2 de Mayo footballers
Cobreloa footballers
Puerto Montt footballers
Chilean Primera División players
Expatriate footballers in Chile
Expatriate footballers in Ecuador
Association footballers not categorized by position